This is a detailed discography for American country music singer Mel Tillis.

Studio albums

1960s

1970s

1980s and 1990s

2000s and 2010s

Collaborations

Live albums

Compilation albums

Singles

1950s

1960s

1970s

1980s and 1990s

Other singles

Collaborations

B-sides

Notes 

A ^ "Life Turned Her That Way" also peaked at number 28 on the Bubbling Under Hot 100 Singles chart.
B ^ "The Arms of a Fool" also peaked at number 14 on the Bubbling Under Hot 100 Singles chart.
C ^ "Take My Hand" also peaked at number 10 on the Bubbling Under Hot 100 Singles chart.

References 

Country music discographies
Discographies of American artists